Gilla na nInghen Ua Cobthaigh, King of Umaill, died 1004.

Ua Cobthaigh is apparently the only ruler of Umaill not to bear the surname Ó Máille

See also

 Grace O'Malley, c.1530-c.1603, "Pirate Queen of Connacht."
 Óró Sé do Bheatha 'Bhaile

External links
 http://www.ucc.ie/celt/published/T100005C/

References

 The History of Mayo, pp. 388–89, T.H. Knox, 1908.

11th-century Irish monarchs
Monarchs from County Mayo
Kings of Uí Maine